Alberta Provincial Highway No. 18, commonly referred to as Highway 18, is a  highway in Alberta, Canada. It stretches from Highway 43 at the hamlet of Green Court, through the towns of Barrhead and Westlock, to Highway 63 east of the hamlet of Thorhild.

Route description
Highway 18 begins northwest of the town of Mayerthorpe at the junction of Highway 43 at the hamlet of Green Court. It turns north for a few kilometres and bends east again until it crosses Highway 764, then curves north again.

The jog in the road skirts Thunder Lake Provincial Park to the north. Upon reaching Highway 763, Highway 18 turns east to the Town of Barrhead where it meets Highway 33. The two highways run concurrently to the north for approximately  until a T–intersection north of town. Highway 18 then turns east from this intersection while Highway 33 turns west.

It continues east, crossing Highway 2 at Clyde at an intersection known as "Clyde Corner". The highway goes through Thorhild as it crosses Highway 827 and proceeds west until it reaches Highways 63 and 656 where it ends.

History
Highway 18 originally was a connection between Highway 2 at Clyde Corner and the towns of Westlock and Barrhead. In the 1940s it was extended northwest from Barrhead to Fort Assiniboine, and then in 1960 to Swan Hills. In , the  section of Highway 18 between Barrhead and Swan Hills was renumbered to Highway 33, while Secondary Highway 655 between Barrhead and Thunder Lake Provincial Park, as well as Secondary Highway 656 between Clyde and Highway 46 (present-day Highway 63) west of Thorhild became part of Highway 18.

Major intersections
From west to east:

References 

018